The USC Sol Price School of Public Policy (USC Price), previously known as School of Policy, Planning, and Development (SPPD), is the public policy school of the University of Southern California in Los Angeles & Sacramento, California. It offers undergraduate and graduate programs, including a doctoral program and several professional and executive master's degree programs. USC Price also offers the Master of Public Administration program at a campus in Sacramento.

History
Urban planning classes were first delivered at USC in Fall of 1921 by Gordon Whitnall, who was instrumental in founding the Planning Commission of the City of Los Angeles. In 1929, the USC School of Citizenship and Public Administration opened its doors, becoming one of only two programs of its kind in the nation. The school did not resemble very much the larger complex school it is today, but it contained the seeds of what is currently the modern USC Price.

In addition to offering a degree in public administration, the School of Citizenship and Public Administration included classes in urban and regional planning from the outset, which eventually led to the urban and regional planning degree and school at USC. Over time, the School of Public Administration formed the health administration program and the public policy program.

In 1955, the School of Public Administration and the School of Architecture and Fine Arts instituted a graduate program in city and regional planning. The graduate planning program grew into an independent academic unit in the 1960s. In 1971, the Irvine Foundation gave its first USC grant to establish an endowed chair in urban and regional planning. In 1974, the USC Board of Trustees merged the Graduate Program in Urban and Regional Planning with the Center for Urban Studies to create the School of Planning and Urban Studies, subsequently the School of Urban and Regional Planning, the first planning program in the nation to achieve status as an independent school. The Irvine foundation provided the new school with an additional endowment for the support of graduate students. The school's undergraduate program was offered jointly with the School of Public Administration.

The School of Urban and Regional Planning formed a graduate program in real estate development in 1985, and founded the Lusk Center for Real Estate Development in 1988 with a private donation, with naming rights, from John Lusk and his family. The school also launched a new undergraduate program to complement its existing program with the School of Public Administration. A gift from Ralph Lewis and his wife Goldy, the co-founders of Lewis Homes, enabled the School to break ground for a new building on May 24, 1995, USC's Ralph and Goldy Lewis Hall. The School was renamed the School of Urban Planning and Development in 1996; and in 1998, the USC Board of Trustees merged the School of Urban Planning and Development with the School of Public Administration to form the School of Policy, Planning, and Development. The Lusk Center for Real Estate Development was reorganized into Lusk Center for Real Estate, a university-level research unit jointly administered by USC Price and the USC Marshall School of Business.

In November 2011, the Price Family Charitable Fund gave a $50 million naming gift to honor the life and legacy of USC alumnus Sol Price, founder of Price Club. The school was renamed the USC Sol Price School of Public Policy with the shortened name of USC Price.

Rankings
In its 2020 rankings, U.S. News & World Report ranked USC Price as:
 #2 in urban policy
 #3 in public affairs
 #3 in nonprofit management
 #5 in health policy and management
 #5 in local government management
 #8 in public management and leadership
 #9 in public policy analysis
USC Price was ranked #9 for its graduate Urban Planning program by Planetizen's "The Top Schools For Urban Planners" (2014 Guide - Top 10 Planning Programs) in 2012.

Academics 
USC Price currently offers:   
Three doctorate programs:
Doctor of Philosophy in Public Policy and Management (Ph.D.)
Doctor of Philosophy in Urban Planning and Development (Ph.D.)
Doctor of Philosophy in Policy, Planning, and Development (Ph.D. Before Fall 2010)
Doctor of Policy, Planning, and Development (DPPD)
Seven master's degree programs:
Master of Public Policy (MPP)
Master of Science in Public Policy Data Science (MPPDS)
Master of Public Administration (MPA)
Master of Nonprofit Leadership and Management (MNLM)
Master of Planning (MPL)
Master of Real Estate Development (MRED)
Master of Health Administration (MHA)
Four executive master's degrees:
Master of International Public Policy and Management (IPPAM)
Executive Master of Health Administration (EMHA)
Executive Master of Leadership (EML)
Online Executive Master of Urban Planning (MUP)
Three undergraduate degrees:
Bachelor of Science in Public Policy
Bachelor of Science in Real Estate Development
Bachelor of Science in Urban Studies and Planning

Online Programs

Online Executive Master of Urban Planning 
The Price School's online Executive Master of Urban Planning program is an accelerated program of 24 units. Students must take 8 core courses and 2 four-day in-person intensive sessions. The program focuses on four main areas: project and land economics; political, legal, and regulatory process and stakeholder outreach; data analysis, visualization and communication; and urban design and the built environment.

Research Centers

Judith and John Bedrosian Center on Governance and the Public Enterprise
Center for Economic Development
Center for Health Financing, Policy and Management
Center for Sustainable Cities
Center on Philanthropy and Public Policy
Center for the Study of Immigrant Integration
Civic Engagement Initiative
Center for Risk and Economic Analysis of Terrorism Events (CREATE)
Keston Institute for Public Finance and Infrastructure Policy
Lusk Center for Real Estate
METRANS Transportation Center
Population Dynamics Group
Schaeffer Center for Health Policy and Economics
Schwarzenegger Institute for State and Global Policy
Tomás Rivera Policy Institute

Notable alumni
Shinzō Abe (studied for three semesters, but dropped out in 1979), Prime Minister of Japan (2006–2007, 2012–2020)
 Marouf al-Bakhit (M.P.A. 1982), 36th Prime Minister of Jordan (2005–2007, 2011–2011)
 Lee Baca (M.P.A. 1973, D.P.A. 1993), 30th Sheriff of Los Angeles County (1998–2014)
 Mike Davis (EML, 2010, Ed.D., 2018) California State Assemblyman, 48th District (2006–2012), President Pro Tem, Los Angeles Board of Public Works Commission (2013–present)
 Vecdi Gönül (M.P.A. 1970), 49th Minister of National Defence of Turkey (2002–2011, 2015–2015) and Member of Parliament for Kocaeli (1999–2015)
Matthew Harper (B.S. 1997) California State Assemblyman, 74th District (2014–2018) and the 59th Mayor of Huntington Beach, California (2013–2014)
Adam Herbert (B.A. 1966, M.P.A. 1968), 17th President of the Indiana University System (2003–2007) and 6th Chancellor of the State University System of Florida (1998–2001)
Alan L. Hoffman (M.P.A. 1991), deputy chief of staff to Vice President Joe Biden (2009–2012)
Irene Hirano (M.P.A. 1973), President of the U.S.-Japan Council (2009–2020) and Chair of the Ford Foundation Board of Trustees (2010–2014)
 Sheila M. Kiscaden (M.P.A. 1986), Minnesota State Senator (2002–2007)
Joyce L. Kennard (B.A. 1970, M.P.A. 1974, J.D. 1974), First Asian-American to serve as an Associate Justice of the California Supreme Court (1989–2014)
 Tim Leslie (M.P.A. 1969), California State Senator (1991–2000) and California State Assemblyman (1986–1991, 2000–2004)
Dennis J. Murray (M.P.A. 1971, Ph.D. 1977), 3rd President of Marist College (1979–2016, 2019–present)
Edward J. Perkins (M.P.A. 1972, Ph.D. 1976), 19th United States Ambassador to the United Nations (1992–1993); U.S. Ambassador to Australia (1993–1996), South Africa (1986–1989), and Liberia (1985–1986)
Rocky Seto (M.P.A. 2001), assistant coach for the National Football League's Seattle Seahawks (2010–2016)
Hilda Solis (M.P.A. 1981), 25th United States Secretary of Labor (2009–2013), United States Congresswoman (2001–2009)
Erroll Southers (M.P.A. 1998, D.P.P.D 2013), leading national expert in transportation security and counter terrorism
Michael L. Williams (B.A. 1975, M.P.A. 1979, J.D. 1979), elected member of the Railroad Commission of Texas (1999–2011)
Tomás Yarrington (M.P.A. 1986), Governor of Tamaulipas, Mexico (1999–2004)

Notable faculty
Dana Goldman, professor of health and economic policy and director of the Schaeffer Center for Health Policy and Economics
Richard K. Green, professor and director of Lusk Center for Real Estate
Houston I. Flournoy, former California State Controller and former Professor of Public Administration
William Fulton (urban planner), senior fellow and mayor of Ventura, California
Daniel McFadden, USC Presidential Professor of health economics
Leonard Mitchell, professor of practice of Economic Development and Executive Director Center for Economic Development*
Dowell Myers, professor of urban planning and demography and director of the Population and Dynamics Research Group center
David Petraeus, Judge Widney Professor of public policy
Arnold Schwarzenegger, professor and director of the Schwarzenegger Institute for State and Global Policy
Erroll Southers, director of homegrown violent extremism studies, director of international programs for the DHS national center for risk and economic analysis of terrorism events (CREATE) and professor of homeland security and public policy.
Kevin Starr, professor of history and former California State Librarian
Jeffrey W. Talley, professor and former lieutenant general
Ehsan Zaffar, visiting fellow at the Bedrosian Center for Governance and civil rights lawyer

References

External links
USC School of Policy, Planning, and Development
USC SPPD in Sacramento

Educational institutions established in 1929
Public administration schools in the United States
Public policy schools
University of Southern California
1929 establishments in California